Almansa is a Spanish Denominación de Origen Protegida (DOP), known for its red wines, located in the southeast of the province of Albacete (Castile-La Mancha, Spain), in the transition zone between the high central plateau (La Mancha) and the Mediterranean Sea. The vineyards are mostly around the towns of Almansa, Alpera, Bonete, Corral-Rubio, Higueruela, Hoya-Gonzalo, Pétrola and  El Villar de Chinchilla.

History
During the Middle Ages, Almansa was a frontier region between Moorish and Christian kingdoms. Almansa Castle (Castillo de Almansa) was built by the Moors to protect the Vinalopo Valley (Valle de Vinalopó) which was for a long time the frontier between the Christian kingdoms of Castile and Aragón.

Climate
The climate is continental (long, hot summers, cold winters). Rainfall is sparse (350 mm per annum) and sporadic usually in spring and autumn in the form of violent storms, often in the form of hail. Temperatures can reach 38°C in summer and -6°C in winter.

Soil
Most of the vineyards are on flat land at altitudes of between 700 and 1000 m above sea level, comprising permeable lime-bearing soils that are poor in nutrients.

Grapes
The authorised grape varieties are:
 Red: Monastrell, Cencibel, Garnacha Tintorera, Garnacha, Cabernet Sauvignon, Merlot, Syrah, Petit Verdot

 White: Verdejo, Chardonnay, Sauvignon blanc, Moscatel de Grano Menudo

The vines are planted with a maximum density of 1,600 vines/ha.

References

External links
 D.O. Almansa official website

Wine regions of Spain